Petrophile rigida is a species of flowering plant in the family Proteaceae and is endemic to southwestern Western Australia. It is a shrub with rigid, branched, needle-shaped, sharply-pointed leaves, and more or less spherical heads of hairy yellow flowers.

Description

Taxonomy
Petrophile rigida was first formally described in 1810 by Robert Brown in Transactions of the Linnean Society of London. The specific epithet (rigida) refers to the leaves.

Distribution and habitat
Petrophile rigida grows in sandy heath with Banksia and Nuytsia species in scattered populations between Regans Ford, the Stirling Range and the Fitzgerald River National Park.

Conservation status
This petrophile is classified as "not threatened" by the Western Australian Government Department of Parks and Wildlife.

References

rigida
Eudicots of Western Australia
Endemic flora of Western Australia
Plants described in 1810
Taxa named by Robert Brown (botanist, born 1773)